The 2003 IFAF World Championship was the second instance of the IFAF World Championship, an American football world championship held by International Federation of American Football (IFAF). The tournament was held in Germany at Herbert Dröse Stadion and Berliner Strasse Stadion. Japan won the championship for the second time in a row.

Participants 
 (Asian champion)
 (American champion)
 (European representatives)
 (Qualify automatically as the hosts)

Venues

Rounds

Semi finals

Final

Winner

Statistics

References

Ifaf World Cup, 2003
Ifaf World Cup, 2003
IFAF World Championship
American football in Germany
International sports competitions hosted by Germany